Trip with the Teacher is a 1975 exploitation film written, produced and directed by Earl Barton. The film has been retitled several times and has been referred to as Deadly Field Trip (VHS release), Duell bis zum Verrecken (Germany), Kiss the Teacher... Goodbye (American promotional title), and Stupro selvaggio  (Italy).

Synopsis
Four teenage girls (along with their teacher and bus driver) from Los Angeles are on a field trip in the desert. On the way to their destination their bus breaks down. While stranded they are approached by three bikers. When Jay (one of the bikers) tries to help the bus driver, the other two bikers start to harass the four girls. As soon as the teacher (Miss Tenny) observes this, she immediately defends the girls; however, she is assaulted for her interruption. After a few scuffles the group of bikers decide to help the stranded bunch and tow them to a remote cabin, with less than good intentions in store. Another altercation ensues, when Al's promise to take them to safety is now obviously broken. Almost as soon as the bus driver (Marvin) steps in, he is run over and killed by Al and his brother, Pete. To keep everyone quiet, Al and Pete hold everyone hostage in the abandoned cottage near the murder site.

Cast

Brenda Fogarty as Miss Tenny
Robert Gribbin as Jay
Zalman King as Al
Robert Porter as Pete
Dina Ousley as Bobbie
Jill Voigt as Tina
Cathy Worthington as Julie
Susan Russell as Pam
Jack Driscoll as Marvin
Edward Cross as Station Attendant
David Villa as Station Customer

See also
 List of American films of 1975

References

External links
 
 

1970s exploitation films
1975 horror films
1975 films
American horror films
American exploitation films
Crown International Pictures films
1970s English-language films
1970s American films